Alfonso X el Sabio University (Universidad Alfonso X El Sabio in Spanish language, UAX) is a private university in the Community of Madrid, Spain.

The number of enrolled students amounts to 8,500 The UAX offers its students the option of carrying out a university exchange in one of more than 150 universities. UAX's academic programs operate on a semester calendar beginning in late September and ending in June.

In March 2019, CVC Capital Partners invested in UAX with a five-year plan to grow the institution locally and internationally The deal was valued at €1.1 billion, according to Acuris.

History

Founded in 1992, it was the first private Spanish university authorised by the country's parliament in 1993. Jesús Núñez created UAX after reaching an agreement with the Town Hall of Villanueva de la Cañada, which granted him the right to use 1 million m2 of land for 75 years on which to build the campus.

In 2019, UAX announced its partnership with the investment advisory firm CVC Capital Partners to build a new international leader in the higher education sector. The five-year plan includes both organic and inorganic growth. Organic growth will be driven by expanding the current offering, growing the number of online students and strengthening its professional training. CVC Capital Partners will become an indirect shareholder of UAX, providing the required financial resources for the business, while current shareholders will remain invested.

Accreditation
UAX is fully adapted to the European Higher Education Area and the professional skills are recognised in all EU member states. Every year, it also welcomes a rapidly growing number of international students with programs like European's Erasmus Programme, Socrates and Leonardo

Residence life 
Residents on campus live in one of three buildings which look out on to the Guadarrama Mountain Range. Roughly 1,000 students live on campus during the academic year.

Notable people

Alumni include Richard Rogers, Bianca Odumegwu-Ojukwu, Maria Rubert.

UAX's faculty includes scholars such as violinist Frederieke Saeijs, pianist Piotr Paleczny, composer Alfonso Maribona, Giuseppe Devastato, Kennedy Moretti, Ashan Pillai, Yehuda Gilad, chairman of Endesa Borja Prado

References

External Links 

 Official page of Alfonso X El Sabio University
 Official page of Alfonso X El Sabio University Online

Universities in the Community of Madrid
1992 establishments in Spain
Private universities and colleges in Spain

Universities and colleges in Spain